Aaron Morgan (born December 30, 1988) is a former American football outside linebacker who played for four seasons in the National Football League (NFL). He was signed by the Jacksonville Jaguars as an undrafted free agent in 2010. He played college football at Louisiana-Monroe.

Professional career

Jacksonville Jaguars
Morgan was signed as an undrafted free agent by the Jacksonville Jaguars after the 2010 NFL Draft. Morgan and two other undrafted free agents made the Jaguars' opening day roster. On October 5, 2012, he was released after the team signed Micheal Spurlock and promoted Ryan Davis from the practice squad.

Indianapolis Colts
Morgan was signed by the Indianapolis Colts to a reserved/future contract. On July 27, 2014, Morgan was placed on injured reserve with an undisclosed injury.

Personal life
He resides in New Orleans, Louisiana. He attended Amite High School in Amite, Louisiana.

References

External links
Tampa Bay Buccaneers bio
Jacksonville Jaguars Bio

1988 births
Living people
Players of American football from New Orleans
American football outside linebackers
American football defensive ends
Louisiana–Monroe Warhawks football players
Jacksonville Jaguars players
Tampa Bay Buccaneers players
Indianapolis Colts players